George Allan Heyl (died April 17, 2020) was a South African criminal, member of the Stander Gang.

Heyl met his accomplices André Stander and Lee McCall in 1977,  while they were in prison together (Heyl had been sentenced in 1977 for an earlier string of bank robberies); Stander and McCall escaped from prison in August 1983, and broke Heyl out in October of that same year.

The three then began a crime spree, which ended on January 30, 1984 when McCall was killed in a shoot-out with police. Stander, who had travelled to America, likewise died in a shoot-out with police there on February 13, 1984.

Heyl, who had travelled to Britain, where he committed further robberies. These led to his arrest and, in 1985, he was tried at Winchester Crown Court and sentenced to nine years in a British prison.

At the end of his British sentence, he was extradited to South Africa, and re-imprisoned on charges pertaining to the Stander Gang robberies. Heyl was serving a sentence of 25 years in Krugersdorp Prison.

Post-prison activities and release
In the 2003 film Stander, Heyl is portrayed by David O'Hara. Heyl, who at the time was still in prison, supplied the filmmakers with much background detail on the gang's practices.

Heyl was paroled in 2005,  and became a motivational speaker.

He died on April 17, 2020.

References

Year of birth missing
2020 deaths
Gang members
South African bank robbers
South African people imprisoned abroad
People extradited from the United Kingdom
Place of death missing
Place of birth missing
Prisoners and detainees of England and Wales
People extradited to South Africa
White South African people